Raymond or Ray Saunders may refer to:

Raymond Saunders (artist) (born 1934), American artist
Raymond Saunders (clockmaker), Canadian clockmaker 
Ray Saunders (American football), college football player